Hugh Ben Smith (August 27, 1934 – May 12, 2016) was an American football wide receiver in the National Football League for the Washington Redskins.  He played college football at the University of Kansas.

References

External links
NFL.com player page

1934 births
2016 deaths
American football wide receivers
Edmonton Elks players
Kansas Jayhawks football players
People from Henryetta, Oklahoma
Washington Redskins players